Talus Lake is located in Grand Teton National Park, in the U. S. state of Wyoming. Talus Lake is  NNE of Rolling Thunder Mountain and is at the head of upper Snowshoe Canyon.

References

Lakes of Grand Teton National Park